Nazrul Islam Ritu (Bengali:নজরুল ইসলাম রিতু; born 15 June 1979) is a Bangladeshi activist and Politician. She was born on 15 June 1979. She is the first hijra (transgender/third gender) elected union parishad chairperson in Bangladesh. She lives in Trilochanpur, Jhenaidah District.

Life and career 
Nazrul Islam Ritu was born in Trilochanpur, but had to flee when she was five years old and took refuge in a transgender commune located in Demra Thana, Dhaka. In her late twenties, she returned to Trilochanpur and became known for her charity and assistance, notably by donating to a number of local Hindu temples and helping with the construction of two new mosques. Ritu started her political career in 2020 from Jhenaidah district, and promised to "eradicate corruption and uproot the drug menace". She ran as an independent in the elections and won against her opponent, Nazrul Islam Sana, who was supported by the ruling Awami League, with an over 2:1 vote ratio.

Notes

References 

21st-century Bangladeshi politicians
Transgender politicians
Hijra (South Asia) people
1979 births
Living people